Amphiareus is a genus of minute pirate bugs belonging to the family Anthocoridae.

The genus was first described by Distant in 1904.

The species of this genus are found in Eurasia and Northern America.

Species:
 Amphiareus constrictus (Stål, 1860)
 Amphiareus obscuriceps (Poppius, 1909)

References

Anthocoridae